The Gypsy Girl at the Alcove (Romanian: Țigăncușa dela iatac) is a 1923 Romanian silent film directed by Alfred Halm. The film premiered in Bucharest on 30 December 1923.

Cast 
 Alger Alexandru
 Balta as A young nobleman
 Victor Beldiman as Strul - the innkeeper
 Ion Cernea
 Charles Chamel as An innkeeper
 Jacques Chapier
 Stelian Crutescu
 Tantzi Elvass as Dochita - Anica's mother
 Ion Fintesteanu
 Jean Georgescu
 Dorina Heller as Anica - Hortopan's gypsy charlady
 Ion Iancovescu as Grigore
 Nicolae Kirilov
 Romeo Lazarescu as A gypsy
 Leon Lefter as Vasile Hortopan
 Dimitriscu Morfeu as A Greek
 Ion Mortun as A beggar
 Ion Murgu
 V. Negoescu as A young nobleman
 Lya Olteanu as Nastasia
 Gheorghe Pagu
 Stefan Petrescu Musca as Agachi - Anica's father
 Elvire Popesco as Maria Tortusanu -Basil's fiancée
 Petre Sturdza as Sandu Hortopan - a rich nobleman
 Maria Vecera as Smaranda Trotusanu
 Ecaterina Vigny as The old gypsy

References

Bibliography 
 Marcel Cornis-Pope & John Neubauer. History of the Literary Cultures of East-Central Europe: Junctures and disjunctures in the 19th and 20th centuries. Volume IV: Types and stereotypes. John Benjamins Publishing, 2010.

External links 
 

1923 films
1923 drama films
Romanian silent films
Romanian drama films
Films based on Romanian novels
Romanian-language films
Films directed by Alfred Halm
Romanian black-and-white films
Silent drama films